The 1947 National League Division Three was the inaugural season of British speedway's National League Division Three

With several new teams joining British Speedway in 1947, a third league tier was created for the first time. Eastbourne Eagles won the title in their first season of league speedway.

Peter Robinson of Southampton topped the averages.

Final table

Leading Averages

See also
List of United Kingdom Speedway League Champions
Knockout Cup (speedway)

References

Speedway National League Division Three
1947 in British motorsport
1947 in speedway